Otto von Helldorff (born 16 April 1833 in Bedra, Saxony; died 10 March 1908 in Bedra, Saxony) was a German landowner and politician for German Conservative Party.

Life 
His father was landowner and politician Heinrich von Helldorff (1799–1873) and Julie Charlotte Gräfin von der Schulenburg (1806–1844). He owned castle Bedra in Saxony and land in Leiha, Schalkendorf and Petzkendorf. He studied German law.  From 1871 to 1874, from 1877 to 1887 and from 1890 to 1893 Helldorf was member of German Reichstag. From 1879 to 1881 and 1884 to 1892  he was president of fraction German Conservative Party in Reichstag and until 1892 president of party German Conservative Party. Since 1890 Helldorff was member in Prussian House of Lords
On 7 July 1867 he married in Hamburg Clara Stammann (1846-1918).

Literature over Helldorff 
 Adelige Häuser. Reihe A. Band I (= Genealogisches Handbuch des Adels. Band 5). Starke, Limburg (Lahn) 1953, ISSN 0435-2408, p. 134.
 Friedrich Freiherr Hiller von Gaertringen: Helldorff, Otto von. In: Neue Deutsche Biographie (NDB). Band 8, Duncker & Humblot, Berlin 1969, ISBN 3-428-00189-3, p. 474 f.
 James N. Retallack: Ein glückloser Parteiführer in Bismarcks Diensten – Otto von Helldorff-Bedra (1833–1908). In: Hans-Christof Kraus (Hrsg.): Konservative Politiker in Deutschland. Eine Auswahl biographischer Porträts aus zwei Jahrhunderten. Duncker & Humblot Berlin 1995, ISBN 3-428-08193-5, p. 185–203.
 Eckhard Hansen, Florian Tennstedt (ed.): Biographisches Lexikon zur Geschichte der deutschen Sozialpolitik 1871 bis 1945. Band 1: Sozialpolitiker im Deutschen Kaiserreich 1871 bis 1918. Kassel University Press, Kassel 2010, ISBN 978-3-86219-038-6, p. 68.

References

External links 
 
 

1833 births
1908 deaths
German politicians
German Conservative Party politicians
Members of the Reichstag of the German Empire
Members of the 1st Reichstag of the German Empire
Members of the 2nd Reichstag of the German Empire
Members of the 3rd Reichstag of the German Empire
Members of the 4th Reichstag of the German Empire
Members of the 5th Reichstag of the German Empire
Members of the 6th Reichstag of the German Empire
Members of the 7th Reichstag of the German Empire
Members of the 8th Reichstag of the German Empire
Members of the Prussian House of Lords
German landowners